Corinne Kaoru Amemiya Watanabe (born August 1, 1950) is an American judge from the state of Hawaii. Watanabe was the first female Attorney General of Hawaii from 1985 until 1986.

Early life and education
Watanabe was born in Wahiawa, Hawaii, on the island of Oahu. Her parents were Keiji and Setsuko (Matsumiya) Amemiya. Watanabe attended Leilehua High School in Wahiawa.

Watanabe received her bachelor’s degree from the University of Hawaiʻi at Mānoa in 1971. Watanabe attended Baylor University and received a Juris Doctor (J.D.) degree in 1974.

Career
Watanabe served as deputy attorney general of Hawaii from 1974 to 1984, then as Attorney General of Hawaii between 1985 and 1986. One case she ruled on was Cobb v. State by Watanabe, which tested the resign-to-run laws. The question was whether State Senator Steve Cobb had to resign his seat in order to run for the United States House of Representatives. The ruling was that Article II, Section 7 of the Hawaii Constitution did not apply for federal office. 

Cobb ran in the 1986 Special election in Hawaii's 1st congressional district to replace Cecil Heftel, who resigned to run for Governor. Watanabe came in fourth place, losing to Neil Abercrombie. Watanabe has been a judge on the Hawaii Intermediate Court of Appeals since May 11, 1992.

See also
List of female state attorneys general in the United States
List of Asian American jurists

References

1950 births
Living people
Hawaii Attorneys General
Hawaii lawyers
Hawaii state court judges
University of Hawaiʻi at Mānoa alumni
Baylor University alumni
American jurists of Japanese descent
Hawaii Democrats
People from Wahiawa, Hawaii
Women in Hawaii politics
21st-century American women